Microglobulin is a globulin of relatively small molecular weight. It can be contrasted to macroglobulin.,

Examples include:
 Beta-2 microglobulin
 Alpha-1-microglobulin

References

Proteins